Susanna Nerantzi was a Greek pianist and composer, perhaps born in Zakynthos, Greece. She is the earliest recorded modern Greek female composer. She studied piano and composition in Corfu under Nikolaos Mantzaros and composed works which were published by Francesco Lucca of Milan in 1839.

Some of her works are exhibited in the Music Museum of the Philharmonic Society of Corfu.

Works
Selected works include:
Les souvenirs (op.26)
Fantasia sulla romanza 'Il lago di Como' (op.27)
Regret pour la patrie (op.28)

References

19th-century classical composers
19th-century Greek musicians
Women classical composers
Greek classical composers
People from Zakynthos
19th-century women composers